The Saint Patrick's Day Parade in Utica, New York is held annually the Saturday before Saint Patrick's Day, March 17. It is the third largest St. Patrick's Day parade in New York State after New York City and Rochester. Its route runs from Oneida Square to Lafayette Street, in Utica. Tens of thousands of people come out and line Genesee Street to join in the festivities. It's a day of celebration for families, children, and all Saint Patrick’s Day celebrators.

Origins

The Saint Patrick's Day Parade now is run by non-profit organizations, but back in 1985 when it started, it wasn’t organized at all. It started from the businesses on Varick Street, mostly bars, wanting to draw crowds down to drum up business for the holiday. The first parade was started and hosted by Rogers Coffee House. The paraders marched down the quarter mile stretch of West Utica. The parade ran down the full length of Varick Street, from Court Street to Columbia Street. Then in the years soon after it became more organized and ran down a block of Court Street, down Varick, and then down a couple blocks of Columbia Street. This however, was an adult parade, made for those who were of the legal drinking age.

Soon the parade was getting bigger, more floats and people were joining. Organizations started getting involved, including The Great American Festival organization. It was decided that the route should be changed. People wanted to bring their children, but did not want to bring them to the area of the bars on Varick Street. The parade was moved to its current location on Genesee Street in 1992.

Blizzard of 1993

In the second year of the parade's current Genesee Street location, paraders went out to celebrate and participate in spite of the incoming 1993 Storm of the Century. When the parade started at 10am it began snowing. By the time it had ended, about 3 hours later, 18 inches had fallen. The parade still continued. Dolly Parton, who attended, gave the parade national attention by talking about it on The David Letterman Show.

Today
Today, the parade is organized and run by the Committee of The Great American Irish Festival. The parade is led by its Grand Marshal, who was chosen by the parade committee as a person of “great Irish pride and moral standing.” The route starts at the circle known as Oneida Square, and continues down Genesee Street past historic buildings such as the Munson Williams Proctor Arts Institute, and the Utica Public Library. Continuing down the street the paraders stop in front of the historic Stanley Theater where the grandstand sits, and where the Mayor, city councilmen, and other important city figures sit with all the Grand Marshals of years past. The paraders dance their jig, sing their songs, or play their instruments. After their stop in front of the grandstand, they continue down to Lafayette Street to the Hotel Utica, and the end of the parade.

The 2017 parade was delayed until March 25 due to the weather. Since 2020, the COVID-19 pandemic caused it to go on hiatus.

After-party

The parade still stirs up business for bars and restaurants in the area, especially on Varick Street. All the bars of Utica are open on the parade day by 10 o’clock. Many of them along the parade route open at 8, so that people can “start their day the Irish way.” The drinking continues throughout the day. As soon as the parade ends, anyone eligible to drink goes to Varick Street, where the police form their own portable station to keep the peace. The whole street is blocked off and the block party begins.

References

Irish-American culture in New York (state)
Parade (Utica, NY)